Housman is a surname. Notable people with the surname include:1553

 A. E. Housman (1859–1936), English classical scholar and poet
 Arthur Housman (1889–1942), American actor
 Clemence Housman (1861–1955), English author, illustrator and activist in the women's suffrage movement
 David Housman
 George Housman Thomas (1824–1868), English painter and illustrator 
 Glen Housman (born 1971), Australian long-distance freestyle swimmer 
 Laurence Housman (1865–1959), English playwright, writer and illustrator
 Rosalie Housman
 Walt Housman (born 1962), American football player

Fictional characters:
 Gary Housman, the fictional main character in the film Balls Out: Gary the Tennis Coach

See also
 Houseman (disambiguation)
 Houseman (surname) 
 Hausmann
 Houtman

Occupational surnames
English-language occupational surnames